Idris bin Ahmad (Jawi: إدريس أحمد; born 19 October 1963) is a Malaysian politician who served as Minister in the Prime Minister's Department for Religious Affairs from 2021 to 2022. He has been the Member of Parliament (MP) for Bagan Serai since November 2022. He was a Senator from 2020 to his election as an MP in 2022.

Idris is also the vice-president of the Malaysian Islamic Party (PAS), a component party of the Perikatan Nasional (PN) coalition.

Election results

Honour
  :
  Commander of the Order of the Territorial Crown (PMW) – Datuk (2022)

References

1963 births
Living people
People from Perak
Malaysian people of Malay descent
Malaysian Muslims
Malaysian Islamic Party politicians
Members of the Dewan Rakyat
Members of the Dewan Negara
21st-century Malaysian politicians